Gettel is a surname of German origin. Notable people with the surname include:

Al Gettel (1917–2005), American baseball player
Michael Gettel, American composer

See also
Gettle

References

Surnames of German origin